Free Range is an innovation and storytelling company based in San Francisco, California and Boston, MA. Founded in 1999, Free Range is a collective of entrepreneurs, designers, academics and researchers combining a disciplined approach to unlocking innovation with the principles of creative storytelling. Its clients range from for-profit, NGO, and government sectors around the globe.

Films
The firm produced the award-winning 2003 animated short film The Meatrix, an animal-rights parody of the 1999 film The Matrix. It and its two short 2006 sequels, The Meatrix II: Revolting and The Meatrix II 1/2, were set in factory farms and a slaughterhouse, and were a commissioned project for the GRACE Communications Foundation.

Books 
In July 2012, Free Range founder Jonah Sachs published his first book with Harvard Business Review Press, Winning the Story Wars: Why Those Who Tell -- and Live -- the Best Stories Will Rule the Future. In Winning the Story Wars, Sachs argues that brands that tell value-driven stories can truly revolutionize marketing. Sachs released his second book, Unsafe Thinking, in 2018, which explains "how to be nimble and bold when you need it most".

References

External links 
 FreeRange:  The official Free Range website.

Benefit corporations